VA-776 was an Attack Squadron of the U.S. Navy Reserve. Details of its early years are sketchy, as few records exist for reserve squadrons prior to 1970, the year during which they began submitting history reports.

On 27 Jan 1968, The President directed the activation of VA-776 following the capture of USS Pueblo (AGER-2) by a North Korean patrol boat on four days earlier. The squadron was deactivated and returned to reserve status on 18 October 1968.

Home port assignments
The squadron was assigned to these home ports, effective on the dates shown:
 NAAS Los Alamitos – 27 Jan 1968
 NAS Lemoore – 13 Jun 1968

Aircraft assignment
The squadron first received the following aircraft on the dates shown:
 A-4B Skyhawk – Feb 1968
 TA-4F Skyhawk – Jun 1968
 A-4E Skyhawk – Jun 1968

See also
List of squadrons in the Dictionary of American Naval Aviation Squadrons
Attack aircraft
List of inactive United States Navy aircraft squadrons
History of the United States Navy

References

Attack squadrons of the United States Navy
Wikipedia articles incorporating text from the Dictionary of American Naval Aviation Squadrons